Fabrizio Bagheria (born 5 April 2001) is an Italian professional footballer who plays as a goalkeeper for  club Livorno on loan from Inter Milan.

Club career
On 19 July 2022, Bagheria joined Recanatese.

Career statistics

Club

References

2001 births
Living people
Footballers from Milan
Italian footballers
Association football goalkeepers
Serie D players
Serie C players
Inter Milan players
Parma Calcio 1913 players
A.C. Prato players
A.C. Renate players
U.S.D. Recanatese 1923 players
U.S. Livorno 1915 players